Ge Li (Chinese: 李革) is a Chinese American entrepreneur and philanthropist. He is the founder and chairman of WuXi AppTec, a contract pharmaceutical research firm.

He is one of the richest men in China and the United States.

Career 
Ge Li was born in China. He graduated from Affiliated High School of Peking University and received his B.A. from Peking University in 1989 and Ph.D. in organic chemistry from Columbia University in 1994. At Columbia, Li was mentored by W. Clark Still and Koji Nakanishi.

He worked for Pharmacopeia, Inc. and was sent to China to form a joint business venture on behalf of the company. Inspired by the visit, Li quit the company and co-founded WuXi AppTec with his wife, Ning Zhao, in Shanghai in 2000. The company was listed in New York Stock Exchange before going public in Hong Kong in 2018.

In 2011, Li was named a member of the Committee of One Hundred.

As of 2022, his net worth stands at $10 billion, making him one of the richest men in China and the United States. He is also the second richest American pharmaceutical businessperson as of 2020. He is also named one of the top ten Chinese CEOs by Forbes China.

Philanthropic activities 
In 2018, Li and Zhao donated RMB 100 million to Peking University to set up the Li Ge-Zhao Ning Education Fund of Peking University and were named the university's honorary trustees.

In 2020, the couple donated $21.5 million to Columbia to advance research and teaching in chemistry.

In 2021, the couple donated $20 million to Memorial Sloan Kettering Cancer Center to support lung cancer research.

Personal life and family 
Li is married to Ning Zhao, his classmate at Peking University and senior vice president and global head of human resources at WuXi AppTec. He owns residences in 220 Central Park South, New York City and Fort Lauderdale, Florida.

References 

Living people
Peking University alumni
Columbia Graduate School of Arts and Sciences alumni
American billionaires
Chinese billionaires
American people of Chinese descent
American philanthropists
American company founders
Chinese company founders
Businesspeople in the pharmaceutical industry
Year of birth missing (living people)